Thunder Over Paris (French: Tempête) is a 1940 French film directed by Dominique Bernard-Deschamps and starring Arletty, Marcel Dalio and Annie Ducaux.

Cast
 Arletty as Ida  
 Marcel Dalio as Barel  
 Annie Ducaux as Jeanne Desmarets  
 Erich von Stroheim as Korlick  
 Henri Bry as Albert Pélissier  
 Henri Guisol as Charlie  
 Jacques Louvigny as Auguste 
 Jacqueline Prévot as Yvonne  
 Julien Carette as L'épicier  
 Jean Debucourt as Gerlier  
 André Luguet as Pierre Desmarets 
 Blanche Denège as La buraliste  
 Henri Marchand as Le badaud bègue  
 Yvonne Yma as La serveuse

References

Bibliography 
 Lennig, Arthur. Stroheim. University Press of Kentucky, 2003.

External links 
 

1940 films
1940s French-language films
Columbia Pictures films
French drama films
1940 drama films
French black-and-white films
1940s French films